Ghost Mountain is the name given by U.S. Army servicemen in 1942 to Mount Obree, a mountain in the Owen Stanley Range in the southeast of Papua New Guinea.

In October 1942, the U.S. Army's first intended offensive operation in the Pacific Campaign of the Second World War was across the Kapa Kapa Trail. Members of the 2nd Battalion, 126th Regiment, 32nd Red Arrow Division were ordered to flank the Japanese in a  march on foot across the Owen Stanley Range, including crossing near Ghost Mountain, considerably east of the more well-known Kokoda Track.

The Kapa Kapa Trail across the Owen Stanley divide was a 'dank and eerie place, rougher and more precipitous' than the Kokoda Track on which the Australians and Japanese were then fighting.

Ghost Mountain earned its name from the eerie phosphorescent glow given off at night by moss-covered trees in the forests on its slopes.  The mountain also claimed the lives of a number of U.S. 5th Air Force air crews during the conflict, and a civilian aircraft since then.

See also

 Kokoda Track Campaign
 32nd Infantry Division

Further reading

  plus Author Interview at the Pritzker Military Library on January 10, 2008

References 

Mountains of Papua New Guinea